Momie cloth is a pebble-surfaced crêpe structure made of any natural or synthetic yarns. Momie crepe is a light weight material made of cotton.

Weave 
Momie cloth is made by using cotton, rayon, or silk in warp and wool in weft. It is woven with granite weave, also called Momie weave, that forms a crepe texture. The weave is tight and interlaced and warp and weft, both visible on the face in the shape of small and irregular pebbles.

Use 
The cloth is used for dresses, curtains, and upholstery. In the 1880s black colored Momie cloth made of cotton, silk, and wool blend was used for mourning.

See also 

 Crêpe (textile)

 Epingline

References 

Woven fabrics